Baldwin Bridge may refer to:

 Raymond E. Baldwin Bridge, Connecticut, US
 Baldwin Bridge, Koblenz, Germany